Ali Beykoz (born 14 November 1964) is a retired Turkish football midfielder and later manager.

References

External links
Mackolik Profile
TFF Profile

1964 births
Living people
People from Hınıs
Turkish footballers
Boluspor footballers
Konyaspor footballers
Adanaspor footballers
Bursaspor footballers
Denizlispor footballers
Zonguldakspor footballers
Türk Telekom G.S.K. footballers
Turkish football managers
Alibeyköy S.K. managers
Siirtspor managers
Boluspor managers
Association footballers not categorized by position